Carson High School is a high school (grades 9–12) in Carson City, Nevada, United States. It is a part of the Carson City School District.

Notable alumni
Mark Amodei – current member U.S. House of Representatives
Bob Ayrault – former major league baseball pitcher
Mackena Bell – NASCAR driver
Dusty Bergman – baseball pitcher, currently with the Sioux City Explorers
Chris Cox (DJ) – Grammy nominated music producer, remixer, and DJ
John Gamble – Former MLB player (Detroit Tigers)
Dean Heller – former U.S. senator from Nevada
Charlie Kerfeld – former major league baseball pitcher
Paul Laxalt (1922-2018) – Nevada governor and U.S. senator
Cdr. Kirk Lippold – commander of the  during terrorist attack
David Lundquist – former MLB player (Chicago White Sox, San Diego Padres)
Donovan Osborne – former major league baseball pitcher
Darrell Rasner – former baseball pitcher, currently a scout for the Tohoku Rakuten Golden Eagles
Matt Williams – former major league baseball third baseman, major league coach, and former manager of the Washington Nationals baseball team.

References

Public high schools in Nevada
Schools in Carson City, Nevada